Twas the Night Before Christmas: Edited by Santa Claus for the Benefit of Children of the 21st Century is a smoke-free version of A Visit From St. Nicholas, attributed to Clement C. Moore, published by Pamela McColl's Grafton and Scratch Publishing in 2012. The book has been translated and published in four different languages.

References

External links
 "Twas the Night Before Christmas" official site

2012 books
Christmas books